Grizabella the Glamour Cat is a main character in the Andrew Lloyd Webber musical Cats. Lonely and decrepit, Grizabella seeks acceptance from the other Jellicle cats but is initially ostracised. She sings the most famous song from the musical, "Memory".

The role was originated by Elaine Paige in the West End in 1981 (replacing Dame Judi Dench four days before the production's opening night), and by Betty Buckley on Broadway in 1982. Buckley won the 1983 Tony Award for Best Featured Actress in a Musical for her portrayal. Jennifer Hudson portrayed Grizabella in the 2019 film adaptation.

Character
Grizabella is, at the time of her appearance, a very old and mangy cat, withered to the point that she no longer resembles the glamorous cat of her youth. Having left the Jellicle tribe a long time ago, she is now all alone and left with only the memories of her happier days. She returns to the tribe seeking re-acceptance, but her fellow Jellicles are initially repulsed by her and repeatedly shun her.

Grizabella makes her entrance early on in the first act of the musical. She approaches the other cats, but they treat her like a pariah as Demeter and Bombalurina explain who she is ("Grizabella: The Glamour Cat"). She comes back at the end of the first act, watching from afar as the other cats dance at the Jellicle Ball. Grizabella attempts to replicate their dance moves but realises she is too weak; she sings a prelude to  "Memory" as she contemplates her plight. Grizabella makes her final appearance towards the end of the musical. This time, she addresses the cats by singing the full version of "Memory" in which she pleads for their understanding and acceptance. She collapses in the middle of the song but is encouraged to press on by the kitten Jemima (also known as Sillabub). After the song, Victoria approaches Grizabella and touches her as a sign of acceptance. The other cats soon follow and welcome her back into the tribe. Grizabella is then led to the Jellicle leader Old Deuteronomy; her initial shock turns to happiness as she begins her ascendance to the Heaviside Layer (the Jellicle version of heaven).

The role of Grizabella requires a wide vocal range and the ability to belt to E♭5.

Origins and songs
Although Cats is based on T. S. Eliot's Old Possum's Book of Practical Cats, Grizabella does not appear in the published source material. Instead, the character came from an unpublished poem by Eliot titled "Grizabella the Glamour Cat" that had been given to Lloyd Webber by Eliot's widow and literary executor, Valerie Eliot. Although the poem had been rejected from Old Possum's Book of Practical Cats for being "too sad for children", it became the basis for Grizabella's character-defining song in the musical ("Grizabella: The Glamour Cat"). The poem centres on a former glamour cat who has fallen on hard times and now roams the red-light district near Tottenham Court.

Additionally, the introduction for "Grizabella: The Glamour Cat" is taken almost word-for-word from a verse in another Eliot poem titled "Rhapsody on a Windy Night", with Grizabella as the feline version of the fallen woman:

The main song that Grizabella sings is "Memory", the best-known song from Cats and "by some estimations the most successful song ever from a musical." It has been recorded around 600 times (as of 2006) by artists including Barbra Streisand, Barry Manilow, Johnny Mathis, Michael Crawford and Kikki Danielsson.

Notable performers
The role of Grizabella was originated by Elaine Paige in the West End in 1981. She later reprised the role for the 1998 film version. Betty Buckley originated the role in the 1982 Broadway production, earning the 1983 Tony Award for Best Featured Actress in a Musical for her performance. In 2015, pop singer Nicole Scherzinger was nominated for a Laurence Olivier Award for Best Supporting Actress for her performance as Grizabella in the West End revival. In the 2016 Broadway revival, Mamie Parris starred as Grizabella after replacing Leona Lewis in October.

Notable performers who have played the role of Grizabella include:

West End
 Elaine Paige (original cast)
 Angela Richards (1982)
 Marti Webb (1983)
 Anita Harris (1985–1986)
 Rosemarie Ford (1995)
 Diane Langton (1996)
 Stephanie Lawrence (1997)
 Sally Ann Triplett (1998)
 Chrissie Hammond (1999–2002)
 Nicole Scherzinger (2014–2015)
 Kerry Ellis (2015)
 Beverley Knight (2015–2016)
 Madalena Alberto (2015–2016)

Broadway
 Betty Buckley (original cast)
 Laurie Beechman (1984–1988, 1997)
 Loni Ackerman (1988–1991)
 Lillias White (1991–1992)
 Liz Callaway (1993–1999)
 Linda Balgord (1999–2000)
 Leona Lewis (2016)
 Mamie Parris (2016-2017)

Film
 Elaine Paige (1998)
 Jennifer Hudson (2019)

Others

 Kim Criswell (Los Angeles, 1985)
 Jan Horvath (US tour, 1990)
 Natalie Toro (US tour, 1992 and 1997)
 Dee Roscioli (US tour, 2002)
 Jacquelyn Piro Donovan (US regional, 2003 and 2009)
 Stephanie J. Block (US regional, 2010)
 Taylor Dayne (New York, 2013)
 Paula Lima (Brazil, 2010)
 María del Sol (México, 1991–1992)
 Filippa Giordano (México, 2013)
 Lisset (México, 2014)
 Rocío Banquells (México, 2014)
 Lila Deneken (México)
 Myriam Montemayor Cruz (México)
 Yuri (México, 2018–2019)
 Ute Lemper (Vienna, 1983)
 Maarja-Liis Ilus
 Di Botcher
 Yukimi Shimura (Original Japanese Cast)
 Monica Aspelund (Finland, 1986)
 Pia Douwes (Vienna and The Netherlands, 1987–1989 and 2006)
 Ruth Jacott (Original Netherlands cast, 1987)
 Akiko Kuno (Japan, 1983–85)
 Mikiko Shiraki (Japan)

 Masako Saito (Japan)
 Vera Mann (The Netherlands, 2006)
 Ruthie Henshall
 Yasuko Sado (Japan)
 Sayoko Hayami (Japan)
 Yukie Yokoyama (Japan)
 Yuri Sawa (Japan, 2004)
 Anita Meyer (The Netherlands, 2006)
 Pernilla Wahlgren (Sweden, 2003)
 Rikako Orikasa (Japan, 2007–09, 2010–12, 2013, 2019–2020)
 Katarína Hasprová (Slovakia, 2016)
 Honoka Suzuki (Japan, 2012–13)
 Aya Kawamura (Japan, 2013–15)
 Joanna Ampil (European Tour 2013, 2016–17)
 Sophia Ragavelas (European Tour 2013–15)
 Kei Miyahara (Japan, 2015)
 Dianne Pilkington (UK tour, 2006)
 Susan McFadden
 Chiaki Kimura (Japan, 2015–2017)
 Jane McDonald (UK Tour, 2015)
 Anita Louise Combe (UK and European Tour, 2016–2017)
 Chimene Badi (Paris, 2016)
 Jenna Lee-James (UK and European Tour, 2017–2019)
 Li-Tong Hsu (International Tour 2019)

 Bev Harrell (Australia/New Zealand), 1989/1990
 Delia Hannah (Australia, 1994 and 2016)
 Marina Prior (Australia, 2014)
 Delta Goodrem (Australia, 2015–2016)
 Debra Byrne (Original Australian cast, 1985)
 Lea Salonga (Manila, 2010)
 Louise Dearman (Cyprus)
 Masae Ebata (Japan, 2017–2019)
 Shin Youngsook (South Korea, 2008–2009)
 Ock Joo-hyun (South Korea, 2008–2009)
 Insooni (South Korea, 2011–2012)
 Park Hae-mi (South Korea, 2011–2012)
 Silvie Paladino (Malaysia)
 Miki Kanehara (Japan, 2019, 2020–2021)
 Emma Hatton (UK Tour, 2018)
 Lucy O'Byrne (UK Tour, 2018–2019)
 Keri René Fuller (US Tour, 2019–2020)
 Donna Vivino (US Tour, 2020)
 Jacinta Whyte (UK and International Tour, 2021–2022)
 Jacintha Abisheganaden (Singapore, 1993)
 Slindile Nodangala (International tour, 2004)

In popular culture
Madame Tussauds New York features a wax figure of Grizabella that sings "Memory".

References

Print sources

External links
 Rhapsody on a Windy Night by T.S. Eliot

Characters in Cats (musical)
Female characters in musical theatre
Anthropomorphic cats